The Music Council of Australia (MCA) is  a national peak music organisation for Australia. It is the official Australian representative to the UNESCO world peak music organization, the International Music Council (IMC), Paris.  The MCA It is also a member of the International Network for Cultural Diversity (INCD), Ottawa.

The 50-member council of the MCA includes nominees of major national music organisations and individual experts. It conducts research, gathers and disseminates information and undertakes advocacy on issues in the musical life of Australia it considers important. The Executive Director of the Music Council of Australia is Dr Richard Letts, who has also been the President of the  International Music Council since 2005.

Notes

Arts councils
UNESCO
Music organisations based in Australia